The statue of Paddington Bear at London Paddington station is a bronze sculpture by Marcus Cornish. Erected in 2000, it marks the association between Michael Bond's fictional bear and the station from which his name derives.

Paddington Bear
The author Michael Bond introduced Paddington Bear to the world in 1958. Inspired by his purchase of a teddy bear as a Christmas present for his wife, and naming the bear Paddington as the couple lived near Paddington Station, Bond imagined the arrival of a real bear at the station in his first novel, A Bear Called Paddington. 

Paddington travels to London from Lima, Peru, stowed away in the life boat of a transatlantic vessel, equipped only with a small suitcase, some marmalade sandwiches and a note attached to his coat which reads, "Please look after this bear. Thank you". Adopted by the Brown family, he undergoes a series of adventures, published in fourteen volumes between 1958 and 2018. The last in the series, Paddington's Finest Hour, was published posthumously, following Bond's death at the age of 91 on 27 June 2017.

Paddington Station
Paddington Station, the London terminus for the "grandest railway in England", the Great Western Railway, opened in 1854. It was designed by the GWR's own architect, Isambard Kingdom Brunel. Brunel was assisted by Matthew Digby Wyatt in the architectural detailing but the construction design was Brunel's alone. He was influenced by Sir Joseph Paxton's design for the Crystal Palace, particularly in relation to the glazed roofs. The station is a Grade I listed building.

Description
The sculpture was created by Marcus Cornish in 2000. Cast in bronze, the statue stands on Platform 1 under the station clock and was unveiled by Michael Bond on 24 February 2000. Its present location is its second within the station, it having been moved from its original position at the foot of the escalators due to renovation work. Bond's obituary in The Guardian described the statue as "one of the few memorials in London to inspire real affection".

See also 
Great Western Railway War Memorial, another monument at Paddington station

References

Sources

External links
 

2000 sculptures
Bronze sculptures in London
Paddington
Statues in the City of Westminster
Statues of fictional characters